Carla Bonner (born 3 March 1973) is an Australian actress, best known for playing the role of Stephanie Scully in the soap opera Neighbours, a role she played from 1999 to 2010. She was also a guest on Celebrity Big Brother Australia in 2002. Following her departure from Neighbours, Bonner wrote a book called Hook, Line and Sink Her and guest starred in an episode of Wentworth. She briefly reprised the role of Steph in 2013, before returning to Neighbours as a permanent cast member from October 2015 until June 2018. She briefly reprised the role in July 2022.

Career
Bonner attended the Australian College of the Arts. Prior to landing her role on Neighbours, Bonner's acting experience was confined to television commercials, corporate videos, and bit parts, including a guest role on Raw FM. When Emma Roche unexpectedly quit the role of Stephanie Scully in Neighbours, Bonner auditioned for the part and was immediately cast as Steph.

On 3 June 2010, it was announced that Bonner had quit Neighbours after eleven years. The character of Stephanie was not killed off, leaving the door open for a potential return. The show's executive producer, Susan Bower, said "The storylines on-air and coming up showcase what an exceptional talent Carla is and while fans will be disappointed, I promise Steph's farewell will be long remembered and will do the character proud."

In 2012, Bonner wrote and published a dating book for men called Hook, Line and Sink Her. That same year, it was announced that Bonner would be returning to Neighbours for two months. The actress began filming her scenes in January 2013 and she made her on-screen return as Steph on 15 April 2013. Bonner portrayed Manda Katsis in episode four of Wentworth. On 10 September 2013, it was announced that Bonner had teamed up with writer and producer Gary O'Toole to develop a 12-part television series based on Hook, Line and Sink Her.

Bonner appeared in the ABC3 teen drama Ready for This in 2015. In July of that year, it was announced Bonner had returned to Neighbours as Steph. She appeared on-screen from October. In May 2018, it was confirmed that Bonner had left the show. That same year, she filmed a role in the ABC Comedy series Superwog.

Personal life
Bonner lives in Northcote, Melbourne with her partner, French musician Julien Piazzon. She has two sons Harley Bonner and Jhye. Harley joined the cast of Neighbours in 2013 as Josh Willis.

Outside Neighbours Bonner follows various public pursuits. She has been involved in several mainstream Australian charities over the years.

Bonner is good friends with Kym Valentine, who played Libby Kennedy in Neighbours. Bonner's character and Valentine's character were also best friends.

In 2007 Bonner was involved in a car accident and was charged with "unlicensed driving" amongst other offences.  She was convicted and fined $1,000.

Filmography

References

External links

1973 births
Living people
Actresses from Melbourne
Australian soap opera actresses
20th-century Australian actresses
21st-century Australian actresses
People from Northcote, Victoria